The 2008 FIBA Stanković Continental Champions' Cup, or 2008 FIBA Mini World Cup, was the fourth edition of the FIBA Stanković Continental Champions' Cup tournament. It was held in Hangzhou, from July 17 to July 21.

Participating teams

 Angola (FIBA Africa Champions) {played with the Olympic team}
 China (host team) {played with the Olympic team}
 Russia (FIBA Europe Champions) {played with a youth team}
 Serbia (Junior World Champions)

Teams played a round-robin tournament.

Results

17 Jul –  China -  Serbia 96:72

17 Jul –  Angola -  Russia - 89:70

19 Jul –  Serbia -  Russia 99:85

19 Jul –  Angola -  China 72:71

20 Jul –  Angola -  Serbia 68:60

21 Jul –  China -  Russia 72:50

Final standings

  Angola (3-0)

  China (2-1)

  Serbia (1-2)

4th  Russia (0-3)

External links
Official Website

2008
2008–09 in Chinese basketball
2008–09 in Angolan basketball
2008–09 in Russian basketball
2008–09 in Serbian basketball